Anatolian hunter-gatherer (AHG) is a distinct anatomically modern human archaeogenetic lineage, first identified in a 2019 study based on the remains of a single Epipaleolithic individual found in central Anatolia, radiocarbon dated to around 13,642-13,073 BCE. A population related to this individual were the main source of the ancestry of later Anatolian Neolithic Farmers, who along with Western Hunter Gatherers (WHG) and Ancient North Eurasians (via Western Steppe Herders) are one of the three currently known ancestral genetic contributors to present-day Europeans.

Introduction 

The existence of this ancient population has been inferred through the genetic analysis of the remains of a male individual from the site of Pınarbaşı (37 ° 29'N, 33 ° 02'E), in central Anatolia, which has been dated at 13,642-13,073 cal BCE. This population is genetically differentiated from the rest of the known Pleistocene populations.

It has been discovered that populations of the Anatolian Neolithic derive a significant portion of their ancestry from the AHG, suggesting that agriculture was adopted in situ by these hunter-gatherers and not spread by demic diffusion into the region.

Genetics 

At the autosomal level, in the Principal component analysis (PCA) the analyzed AHG individual turns out to be close to two later Anatolian populations, the Anatolian Aceramic Farmers (AAF) dating from 8300-7800 BCE, and the Anatolian Ceramic Farmers (ACF) dating from 7000-6000 BCE. These early Anatolian farmers later replaced the European hunter-gatherers populations in Europe to a large extent, ultimately becoming the main genetic contribution to current European populations, especially those of the Mediterranean. In addition, their position in this analysis is intermediate between Natufian farmers and Western Hunter-Gatherers (WHG). This last point is confirmed by the ADMIXTURE and qp-Adm analysis and confirms the presence of hunter-gatherers of both European and Near-Eastern origins in Central Anatolia in the late Pleistocene. Mesolithic individuals from the Balkans, known as Iron Gates Hunter-Gatherers, are the most genetically similar group to the Anatolian Hunter-Gatherer lineage. Feldman et al. suggest that this affinity is not due to a genetic flow from the AHG to the ancestors of the Villabruna cluster, but on the contrary: there was a genetic flow from the ancestors of the Villabruna cluster to the ancestors of the AHG.

The AHG  (according to Fu et al. 2016) diverged from Caucasus hunter-gatherer around 25,000 years ago.

Uniparental markers 
The individual analyzed belongs to Y-chromosomal haplogroup C1a2 (C-V20), which has been found in some of the early WHGs, and mitochondrial haplogroup  K2b. Both paternal and maternal lineages are rare in modern Eurasian populations.

See also
 Early European Farmers

References

Bibliography

 

Archaeogenetic lineages
Prehistoric Anatolia
Population genetics
Epipalaeolithic
Hunter-gatherers of Asia